

Ba...

Be...

Bi...

Bl...

Bo...

Br...

Bu...

B